Guallatiri is a  high volcano in Chile. It is located southwest of the Nevados de Quimsachata volcanic group and is sometimes considered to be part of that group. It is a stratovolcano with numerous fumaroles around the summit. The summit may be composed of either a lava dome or a pyroclastic cone, while the lower flanks of the volcano are covered by lava flows and lava domes. The volcano's eruptions have produced mostly dacite along with andesite and rhyolite.

Guallatiri has been active in historical times with a number of eruptions, the latest in 1960 but a large prehistorical eruption took place 2,600 years ago. Fumarolic and seismic activity is ongoing and has resulted in the deposition of sulfur and other minerals on the volcano. The volcano is covered by an ice cap above  elevation that has shrunk and fragmented during the course of the 20th-21st century. Guallatiri, along with several other volcanoes, is part of Lauca National Park and is monitored by SERNAGEOMIN.

Name and first ascent 

The term  means "abundance of the Andean goose" in Aymara and refers to its frequent occurrence in the area. Other names are Punata which is also Aymara, Huallatiri and Huallatire. It was first climbed by the German-Bolivian geologist  in 1926.

Geography and geomorphology 

The volcano lies in the Putre municipality in the Arica and Parinacota Region. It is located south of Lake Chungara
The latter is part of the Nevados de Quimsachata volcano chain which also includes Humurata and Acotango; sometimes Guallatiri is considered to be part of the Nevados de Quimsachata. Guallatiri is part of the larger Western Cordillera which is the western boundary of the Altiplano high plateau.

Other towns include Ancuta, Carbonire and Churiguaya.  each had a population of less than 25 people. Economic activity in the area include the Tambo Quemado border crossing, agriculture, animal husbandry as well as tourism and mountaineering, including ascents to the summit of Guallatiri. The frontier between Bolivia and Chile runs along the Nevados de Quimsachata northeast of Guallatiri and is not far from the volcano. The volcano is remote and thus poorly known.

The volcano 

It is a composite volcano or stratovolcano with a symmetric cone surmounted by a lava dome or lava complex and a vent just south of it. The summit area has also been interpreted as an eroded volcanic plug or as a lava dome.

Lava domes, lava flows, tephra and volcanic ash make up the volcano. The lava flows have a lobate appearance even when they are heavily eroded, and displays levees, ogives, polygonal cracks and blocky surfaces. Older flows have been eroded into hills. Fans of block-and-ash flows occur on the southern and southwestern flanks. Tephra deposits are mainly located on the eastern and southern side of Guallatiri. Tuffs and pyroclastic flow deposits occur both in the summit region and in radial valleys that emanate from Guallatiri although some of the latter have been reinterpreted as being reworked sediments.
Apart from volcanic rocks, glacial deposits cover large parts of the volcano and there are traces of mass failures.

On the southern flank, there are two lava domes named Domo Tinto and Domo Sur; other than these Guallatiri has no lateral vents. Domo Tinto has a hummocky surface and resembles a pancake.

There are both cold springs and hot springs on Guallatiri, indicating that groundwater interacts with the magmatic system. Several streams run off the mountain; they eventually enter Lake Chungara and the Rio Lauca.

Ice 

Above - elevation the volcano is covered with ice. Heat emitted by fumaroles may have contributed to the enhanced melting of the ice.

Unlike the global last glacial maximum which peaked between 21,000 and 19,000 years ago, in the area of Guallatiri glaciers reached their maximum extent between 13,500 and 8,900 years ago. This is a consequence of the climate in the region, where glacier extent was more sensitive to increased moisture supply than to decreasing temperatures. Some glaciers were still present during the Holocene, as the Domo Tinto lava dome bears traces of glacial erosion and is partially covered by moraines.

Volcanic units overlie glacial deposits, or inversely glacial deposits such as various types of moraines overlie older volcanic rocks. Older volcanic rocks bear glacial striations and volcanic bombs on the lower flanks may have been transported there by glaciers.

Geology 

The subduction process is responsible for the volcanism of the Northern Volcanic Zone (NVZ), Central Volcanic Zone (CVZ) and Southern Volcanic Zone (SVZ) and has also driven the formation of the Altiplano during the last 25 million years.

It contains about 58 volcanoes which are potentially active or active, 33 of which are located within Chile. The most active of these is Lascar, which in 1993 produced the largest historical eruption of northern Chile.

Guallatiri rises above Oligocene to Pliocene age volcanic and sedimentary rocks, which define the Lupica and Lauca Formations. The Lupica Formation is older and consists mainly of volcanic rocks, while the Lauca Formation is formed by volcanic and sedimentary rocks that were deposited within the basin and in part glacially overprinted. The basement consists of Archean to Precambrian-Paleozoic rocks. There is evidence that the terrain was tectonically active during the Quaternary.

Composition 

The composition of volcanic rocks ranges from andesite to rhyolite; with dacites being predominant. The summit dome is formed by dacite and most outcrops are trachyandesite and trachydacite. The rocks define a potassium-rich calc-alkaline suite and contain amphibole, apatite, biotite, clinopyroxene, olivine and plagioclase phenocrysts, similar to other volcanoes in the region. The occurrence of obsidian has been reported. Mafic rock enclaves have been observed in Domo Tinto rocks, which indicate that mafic magmas were injected into the magma chamber and mixed with already present magma. Fractional crystallization and magma mixing processes gave rise to Guallatiri's magmas.

Fumaroles have deposited minerals such as anhydrite, baryte, cristobalite, gypsum, quartz, sassolite and sulfur. Less common are galena, orpiment and pyrite. Sulfur deposits have yellow, orange or red colours and are sometimes accompanied by arsenic-sulfur compounds that also contain iodine, mercury, selenium and tellurium. Sulfur deposits are reported from its southern flank, and according to the first Panamerican Congress on Mine Engineering and Geology, in 1942 the volcano featured about 800,000 tonnes sulfur ore with a grade of about 55% sulfur. The volcano may be an important source of arsenic pollution in the region.

Flora, fauna and climate

The volcano is inside the Lauca National Park and the wetlands - bofedales - in the area of Guallatiri have regional importance. Vegetation there include Arenaria rivularis, Calandrinia compacta, Deyeuxia curvula, Distichlis humilis, Lobelia oligophylla and Oxychloe andina. Animal species include birds such as the Andean flamingo, Andean gull, Andean goose, buff-winged cinclodes, Chilean flamingo, condor, giant coot, James's flamingo, mountain parakeet, Puna ibis, Puna tinamou and torrent duck. Among the mammals are the alpaca, Altiplano chinchilla mouse, Andean swamp rat, lesser grison, llama, mountain degu, Osgood's leaf-eared mouse, short-tailed chinchilla and vicuña. Woodlands formed by the tree Polylepis tarapacana occur on Guallatiri; this tree forms the world's highest woodlands.

The region features a tundra climate. Moisture mainly originates in the Atlantic Ocean and the Amazon and arrives on the Altiplano mainly during the summer months, especially during cold events of the El Niño-Southern Oscillation when moisture supply increases. Tree ring chronologies from Polylepis tarapacana trees growing at Guallatiri have been used for climate reconstructions.

Eruptive history 

Volcanic activity at Guallatiri commenced about 710,000 or 262,000-130,000 years ago and the volcano subsequently grew during the Pleistocene and Holocene. The older Humurata and Acotango volcanoes are heavily eroded while Capurata is better preserved.

During an initial stage, "Guallatiri I" grew in the form of andesitic and dacitic lava flows as well as heavily eroded pyroclastic deposits, which crop out around the volcano. Then the dacitic "Guallatiri II" developed in close proximity to the central vent; unlike "Guallatiri I" units it has not been eroded by glaciation and flows preserve flow structures. The central sector of the volcano is mainly of Holocene age while the peripheral parts date to the Pleistocene. Later research subdivided the growth of the volcano into seven separate stages, of which 1-4 crop out mainly at the periphery of the volcano and 5-6 in its central sector. All these units were erupted by the central vent of Guallatiri. Some lava flows are well preserved, others have been glaciated.

Evidence indicates that large eruptions similar to the one of Lascar in 1993 may have occurred at Guallatiri. Non-explosive eruptions also took place, such as the Domo Tinto eruption 5,000±3,000 years ago. The eruption emplaced lobes of lava over a flat surface.

Pyroclastic flow deposits extend to  distance from Guallatiri. Radiocarbon dating has yielded ages ranging between 6,255±41-140±30  years before present. These flows are unrelated to the lava domes, which show no evidence of collapses that could have formed pyroclastic flows. Lahar deposits are found on the southern flanks of the volcano and do not exceed  thickness. They form when volcanic material interacts with water, produced either by the melting of ice or through intense rainfall. Holocene lahar deposits have been found in river valleys.

Historical and seismic activity 

Guallatiri is after Lascar the second-most active volcano in northern Chile, with numerous small explosive eruptions since the 19th century which produced thin tephra layers. The eruption history of Guallatiri is poorly known and historical eruptions are poorly documented. Eruptions with a volcanic explosivity index of 2 took place in 1825 ± 25, 1913, July 1959 and December 1960. A further uncertain eruption took place in 1908 and additional poorly documented eruptions are reported from 1862, 1864, 1870, 1902, 1904 and 1987. Radiocarbon dating has yielded evidence of at least one eruption during the past 200 years.

Increased steam emission was observed in December 1985 and initially attributed to Acotango volcano, before it was linked to Guallatiri; it may have been an eruption of the latter.

Shallow earthquakes and sporadic seismic swarms are recorded at Guallatiri; one such swarm was induced by the 2001 Peru earthquake. Satellite imaging has not shown any evidence of ongoing deformation of the volcanic edifice.

Fumarolic activity 

Guallatiri features fumaroles and solfataras, and mud pools have been reported as well. Some sources also identify a third area on the upper western flank. Other minerals deposited by the fumaroles are sulfates such as baryte and sulfides, including cinnabar, antimony sulfides and arsenic sulfides.

Guallatiri produces gases consisting of carbon dioxide and water vapour, with hydrogen chloride, hydrogen fluoride, hydrogen sulfide, methane and sulfur dioxide as additional components. They appear to originate from a hydrothermal system where intense rock-gas interaction takes place. The water originates in part from the magma and in part from precipitation. Different degrees of interaction with precipitation water may explain why the south-southwestern flank fumarole gases have a different composition than these released in the summit region. The fumarolic activity has produced intense hydrothermal alteration of Guallatiri's rocks east-northeast of the summit and at a lower elevation northwest of it.

Fumarole plume 

The fumarole clouds emanating mainly from the summit fumarole are visible from more than  distance and also from infrared satellite images. The fumarole cloud influences the perception of volcanic activity by the local population.

Jet-like noises are heard from the fumaroles. According to a report by mountaineers in 1966, fire emanated from the fumarole vents.

Hazards and monitoring 

Future eruptions may consist of the emission of lava domes or lava flows, preceded by explosive activity that could impact the settlements of Ancuta and Guallatiri on the southern and western flanks. Large explosive eruptions could deposit pyroclastics over hundreds of kilometres, with the direction depending on the wind direction at the time of the eruption. Lahars would mainly impact the western and southwestern sectors of the volcano, as the snow cover is concentrated there. Lava flows would also primarily impact this sector of the volcano. Pyroclastic flows may impact areas within  from Guallatiri, including the settlements Ancuta and Guallatiri. Apart from Ancuta and Guallatiri in Chile, the volcano may threaten towns in Bolivia and ash clouds from Guallatiri could impact airports in the wider region as far as Paraguay. The vulnerability of the local population reflects both the widespread poverty and marginalization on the one hand, and the low population density on the other hand. Significant eruptions are expected to reoccur on century timescales.

Guallatiri is ranked second in the Chilean scale of dangerous volcanoes and the 30th most dangerous in the country. In 2013, the Southern Andean Volcano Observatory began to monitor the volcano with video surveillance, measurements of seismic activity and deformations of the volcanic edifice. Volcano hazard maps have been published.

Mythology and religious importance 

In the oral tradition of Chipaya, cold winds called  blow from the Pacific Ocean to the Altiplano and towards Guallatiri. The volcano there is linked with hell. They believed that the waters of the Lauca River originate on Guallatiri and directly from hell.

On the contrary, Guallatiri was also considered to be an apu, a protective mountain spirit. The mountain was and still is worshipped by local inhabitants, and the church in the town of Guallatiri is constructed in a way that it points to the volcano. There are no known archeological sites on the summit of Guallatiri, unlike several other mountains in the region. Either the continuous ice cover or the constant volcanic activity may be the reason.

See also 
 List of volcanoes in Bolivia
 List of volcanoes in Chile
 Kuntur Ikiña

Notes

References

Sources 

 
 
 
 
 
 
 
 
 
 
 
 
 
 
 
 
 
 
 
 
 
 
 
 
 
 
 
 
 
 
 
 
 
 
 
 
 
 
 
 
 
 
 
 
 

Active volcanoes
Volcanoes of Arica y Parinacota Region
Stratovolcanoes of Chile
Mountains of Chile
Six-thousanders of the Andes
Pleistocene stratovolcanoes
Holocene stratovolcanoes